The Gallery of Modern Art (GoMA) is the main gallery of contemporary art in Glasgow, Scotland.

GoMA offers a programme of temporary exhibitions and workshops. GoMA displays work by local and international artists as well as addressing contemporary social issues through its major biannual projects.

History
Opened in 1996, the Gallery of Modern Art is housed in a neoclassical building in Royal Exchange Square in the heart of Glasgow city centre. Built in 1778 as the townhouse of William Cunninghame of Lainshaw, a wealthy Glasgow Tobacco Lord who made his fortune through the triangular slave trade, the building has undergone a series of different uses. It was bought in 1817 by the Royal Bank of Scotland who later moved onto Buchanan Street; it then became the Royal Exchange. Reconstruction for this use was undertaken by David Hamilton between 1827 and 1832 and resulted in many additions to the building, namely the Corinthian pillars to the Queen Street facade, the cupola above and the large hall to the rear of the old house.

In 1954, after purchasing the building for £105,000 in 1949, Glasgow District Libraries moved the Stirling's Library into the building. It also housed the Library of Patents and the Commercial Library. It was described as:"A magnificent hall, 110 ft. by 60 ft.,... divided in to three parts by a double row of monolithic Corinthian columns and spanned by a 30ft high richly ornamented arched ceiling." Special book-cases were aligned with the columns, lit by fluorescent lighting to illuminate the books. There was a collection of over 100 books on the pictorial arts, 300 volumes of music books and scores, and 800 books for parents. Seven-feet high display units were used to display items. There was a magazine room with seating for fifty readers.

When the library returned to Miller Street, the building was refurbished to house the city's contemporary art collection.

Today

Since its opening in 1996, the gallery has hosted several million visitors. It has a dedicated Education and Access studio, facilitating workshops and artists talks and in the basement a Learning Library. The building also contains a café, free Internet access terminals, multimedia, art, and general book-lending facilities. Exhibits include works by David Hockney, Sebastião Salgado, and Andy Warhol as well as Scottish artists such as John Bellany and Ken Currie.

The mirrored pediment on the exterior of the building is by artist Niki de Saint Phalle, entitled Tympanum (1996). Saint Phalle also installed the mirrored vestibule to the gallery.

In front of the gallery, on the Queen Street pavement, stands an equestrian statue of the Duke of Wellington sculpted by Carlo Marochetti in 1844. The statue usually has a traffic cone on its head; for many years the authorities regularly removed cones, only for them to be replaced. The jauntily placed cone has come to represent, particularly in tourist guidebooks, the city's light-hearted attitude to authority. Two exceptions were on the occasion of Glasgow hosting the 2002 UEFA Champions League final, when the cone was replaced by a football-patterned hat bearing the logo of one of the tournament sponsors, Amstel, and in June 2010, on the run-up to the opening of hotel chain citizenM in Glasgow, when the cone was replaced with a 'feel free' branded glitter cone. Around the time of the Independence Referendum, a saltire was attached to the cone.

The cone was painted gold during the 2012 Olympics as a celebration of Scotland's contribution to the record haul of gold medals won by Team GB. A gold cone was again placed on the statue for the 2014 Commonwealth Games.

On 'Brexit Day' (31 December 2020) pro-european supporters placed a cone painted to represent the EU flag on the statue's head.

See also

Culture in Glasgow
Glasgow art

References

External links
 Museum website
 Historic Glasgow Architecture 
 Photographs of the Gallery of Modern Art in Glasgow

Houses completed in 1778
Modern art museums
Category A listed buildings in Glasgow
Art museums and galleries in Glasgow
1770s establishments in Scotland
Contemporary art galleries in Scotland
Art museums established in 1996
1996 establishments in Scotland
Neoclassical architecture in Scotland